Note: This is a sublist of List of Confederate monuments and memorials from the North Carolina section.

This is a list of Confederate monuments and memorials in North Carolina that were established as public displays and symbols of the Confederate States of America (CSA), Confederate leaders, or Confederate soldiers of the American Civil War. Part of the commemoration of the American Civil War, these symbols include monuments and statues, flags, holidays and other observances, and the names of schools, roads, parks, bridges, counties, cities, lakes, dams, military bases, and other public works.

This list does not include items which are largely historic in nature such as historic markers or battlefield parks if they were not established to honor the Confederacy. Nor does it include figures connected with the origins of the Civil War or white supremacy, but not with the Confederacy.

According to the Southern Poverty Law Center, there are at least 140 public spaces with Confederate monuments in North Carolina.

Governor Roy Cooper "has called for the removal of monuments honoring Confederate soldiers and generals", including the Chapel Hill Silent Sam statue. He has called for the repeal of a 2015 law requiring legislative approval to remove Confederate monuments.

State capitol

 North Carolina State Capitol. The Capitol currently houses the offices of the Governor of North Carolina. The legislature relocated to its current location in the North Carolina State Legislative Building in 1963.In 2017, Governor Roy Cooper unsuccessfully petitioned the North Carolina Historical Commission to move the following three Confederate monuments from the grounds of the state Capitol to the Bentonville Battlefield, a Civil War site in Johnston County. The Commission found that the 2015 law prohibited their removal, but recommended signage to add context to the monuments, including noting that slavery was a cause of the Civil War. The Commission also found unanimously that the Capitol monuments are "an overrepresentation and over-memorialization" of the Confederacy and Civil War in North Carolina. The Commission urged the state’s Department of Natural and Cultural Resources to plan and raise money for a monument recognizing the contributions of African Americans to North Carolina's history. On June 19, 2020, the two statues at the base of the monument were toppled by protestors. The protestors proceeded to drag one statue to the streets and hang it from a street light.
 Monument Removed June 21, 2020  - North Carolina State Confederate Monument (1895), also known as the Soldiers and Sailors Monument. "This 75-foot-tall monument to fallen Confederate soldiers is located on the State Capitol grounds. At the top of the column is a statue depicting a Confederate artillery soldier holding a gun. Near the bottom of the column are two statues, one representing the Confederate infantry and the other a Confederate cavalryman. Two 32 pounder naval cannons stand on each side of the monument." Contains the Seal of North Carolina. Front: "To Our Confederate Dead." Rear: "First at Bethel, last at Appomattox".
 Monument Removed June 21, 2020  - Monument to North Carolina Women of the Confederacy, also called Confederate Women's Monument (1914). "The seven foot tall monument, made possible through a private donation, honors the hardships and sacrifices of North Carolina women during the Civil War. A bronze sculpture depicts an older woman, a grandmotherly figure, holding a book as she sits next to a young boy holding a sword. It sits on top of a granite base with bronze bas-relief plaques. The woman, representing the women in the South as the custodians of history, imparts the history of the Civil War to the boy. The two relief plaques portray the Civil War; the eastern side shows soldiers departing for war and leaving their loved ones behind, while the western side depicts a weary or injured Confederate soldier returning home." In 2019, a protester placed Ku Klux Klan hoods on the two figures.
 Monument Removed June 21, 2020  - Henry Lawson Wyatt Monument (1912). He was the first Confederate soldier to die in battle. Sculpture by Gutzon Borglum. Inscriptions:Front: HENRY LAWSON WYATT / PRIVATE CO. A / BETHEL REGIMENT / NORTH CAROLINA VOLUNTEERS / KILLED AT BETHEL CHURCH / JUNE 10, 1861 / FIRST CONFEDERATE SOLDER | TO FALL IN BATTLE IN THE | WAR BETWEEN THE STATES.Rear: WYATT'S COMRADES / IN DASH TO BURN THE HOUSE / GEORGE T. WILLIAMS / JOHN H. THORPE / ROBERT H. RICKS / ROBERT H. BRADLEY / THOMAS FALLON / ERECTED BY THE NORTH CAROLINA | DIVISION, UNITED DAUGHTERS | OF THE CONFEDERACY. / JUNE 10, 1912Base, east face: GORHAM. Co. FOUNDERS.
 In addition, the following Civil War monuments are on the Capitol grounds:
 A statue of Confederate Colonel Zebulon Baird Vance, Governor during the Civil War, 1862–1865.
 Monument to Civil War Captain and North Carolina legislator Samuel A'Court Ashe (1940), two plaques on a large granite block.

Monuments

Courthouse monuments

 Albemarle: Confederate Soldiers Monument (1925)
 Asheville:
 To be removed per 6–1 decision of Asheville City Council on March 23, 2021:  Zebulon Baird Vance Monument, a granite obelisk erected in 1896. Near the obelisk, a small granite marker memorializes the Dixie Highway, Confederate Gen. Robert E. Lee, and Col. John Connally, a Confederate officer who was wounded at the Battle of Gettysburg. Near the Buncombe County Courthouse entrance, a smaller obelisk memorializes Confederate soldiers from Buncombe County who fought at Chickamauga and in other Civil War battles. The monument was vandalized in August 2017 and 4 individuals out of 30–40 protesters were arrested for trying to remove it with crowbars.
 Monument to 60th Regiment North Carolina Volunteers (1905)
 Memorial plaque to Lieutenant William Henry Hardy (1930), "the First Soldier from Buncombe County to Fall in the War Between The States"
 Bakersville: Mitchell County's Confederate Dead Monument (2011) commemorates 79 men "who died for their freedom and independence. And not for slavery."
 Beaufort: Carteret County Confederate Soldiers Monument (1926) at the Carteret County Courthouse. "TO THE MEMORY OF THE CONFEDERATE DEAD  OF CARTERET COUNTY 1861-1865 ERECTED BY THE DAUGHTERS OF CONFEDERACY FORT MACON CHAPTER BEAUFORT, N.C. 1926 NOT EVEN TIME CAN DESTROY HEROISM" 
 Burgaw: Confederate Soldiers Monument (1914)
 Burnsville: Confederate Soldiers Monument (2009)
 Clinton: Monument removed July 12, 2020. Confederate Soldiers Monument (1916). "In honor of the Confederate soldiers of Sampson County who bore the flag of a nation's trust and fell in a cause though lost still just and died for me and you."
 Columbia: Confederate Soldiers Monument (1902); "In appreciation of our faithful slaves"
 Concord: Confederate Soldiers Monument (1892) at Old Cabarrus County Courthouse
 Currituck: Confederate Soldiers Monument "To Our Confederate Dead 1861–1865" (1918)
 Dallas: Gaston County Confederate Soldier Monument (2003)
 Danbury: Confederate Soldiers Monument (1990)
 Dobson: Confederate Soldiers Monument (2000)
 Elizabeth City: Confederate Soldiers Monument (1911)
 Gastonia: Confederate Soldiers Monument, Gaston County Courthouse, dedicated November 21, 1912
 Graham: Confederate Soldiers Monument (1914), Alamance County Courthouse. Demonstrators called for its removal in 2017, and the matter was discussed at an Alamance County Commission meeting.
 Greenville: Confederate Soldiers Monument (1914)
 Hendersonville: Confederate Soldiers Monument (1905)
 Hertford: Confederate Soldiers Monument (1912)
 Laurinburg: Confederate Soldiers Monument (1912), sponsored by UDC. "The Scotland County monument has been moved several times in the years since first being placed. Originally it sat in the middle of the road in front of the courthouse at Main and Church streets. It was then moved onto the grounds of the courthouse after becoming a traffic hazard. When the new courthouse was completed in the 1960s, the monument moved with it and was placed in its current location.... [T]he inside contains time capsules."
 Lincolnton: Confederate Soldiers Memorial Drinking Fountain (1911)
 Louisburg: The Confederate Memorial Drinking Fountain (1923) is dedicated to North Carolinian Orren Randolph Smith, who designed the Stars and Bars, the first official flag of the Confederacy. It is five feet high, six feet across, and has separate "white" and "colored" drinking fountains. A similar marker is in Wilson, North Carolina (below).
 Lumberton: Confederate Soldiers Monument (1907)
 Marion: Veterans Memorial
 Morganton: Confederate Soldiers Monument at Old Courthouse (1918)
 Newton: Catawba County Confederate Soldiers Monument (1907), Old Catawba County Courthouse
 Oxford: the Granville Gray- originally dedicated directly in front of the Granville County Courthouse it was moved to the local library after the 1970 protests following the murder of Henry Marrow.
 Plymouth: Battle of Plymouth monument (1928) at Washington County Courthouse
 Roxboro:
 Confederate Monument (1931)
 Confederate Soldiers Monument, Person County Courthouse, erected in 1922, UDC.
 Rutherfordton: Confederate Soldiers Monument (1910)
 Shelby: Confederate Soldiers Monument (1907) at Old Courthouse
 Snow Hill: Confederate Soldiers Monument (1929)
 Statesville: Confederate Soldiers Monument (1906) at Iredell County Courthouse
 Taylorsville: Confederate Soldiers Monument (1958)
 Trenton: Confederate Soldiers Monument (1960)
 Wadesboro:
 Confederate Soldiers Monument (1906)
 Confederate Women Monument (1934)
 Warrenton: Confederate Soldiers Monument (1913)
 Waynesville: Confederate Soldiers Monument (1940)
 Wilkesboro: Confederate Soldiers Monument (1998)
 Wilson: Memorial Drinking Fountain (1926). This fountain, like a similar one from the same artist in Louisburg, NC, originally had "white" and "colored" water fountains, separated by the Confederate flag. The water bowls have been removed and replaced with generic tops, and the labels "white" and "colored" sandblasted off; their location is clearly visible.
 Winton: Confederate Soldiers Monument (1913)

Other public monuments

 Asheboro: Confederate Soldiers Monument (1911)
 Asheville: Confederate Soldiers Monument (1903), Newton Academy Cemetery
 Beaufort: Confederate Soldiers Monument (1926), Carteret County Courthouse
 Bentonville: Monuments located at the Battle of Bentonville site include:
 Confederate Monument (1895)
 Joseph E. Johnston Monument (2010)
 Unincorporated Cabarrus County, near Concord: Stonewall Jackson Youth Development Center (a correctional facility) 
 Charlotte:
 Confederate Soldiers Monument (1977)
 Jefferson Davis Plaque (1960)
 Last Meetings of the Confederate Cabinet Marker (1915)
 1929 Confederate Reunion Marker (1929). "Erected by citizens of City of Charlotte and County of Mecklenburg commemorating the 39th Confederate Reunion June 4–7, 1929." Currently (2018) protected by a glass enclosure.
 Judah P. Benjamin Memorial "erected in His Honor by Temple Israel and Temple Beth El, the Jewish Congregations of Charlotte, as a Gift to the North Carolina Division, United Daughters of the Confederacy" (1948)
 Concord:
 Confederate Soldiers Monument (1892)
 Jefferson Davis Camp marker, showing where Davis "hitched his horse to a tree which stood on this spot" (1941)
 Cornelius: Confederate Soldiers Monument (1910), Mt. Zion United Methodist Church. 19600 Zion Avenue.
 Edenton: Confederate Soldiers Monument (1909); moved from courthouse in 1961
 Enfield: Confederate Soldiers Memorial (1928) at Elmwood Cemetery. Originally located in downtown Enfield, the sculpture contains a drinking fountain.
 Faison: Monument to the "Confederate Grays" 20th Regiment North Carolina State Troops (1932)
 Fayetteville:
 Confederate Soldiers Monument (1868) at Cross Creek Cemetery; the first Confederate monument in North Carolina
 Confederate Soldiers Monument (1902)
 Confederate Arsenal (1928)
 Judah P. Benjamin marker (1944)
 Fletcher:
 Jefferson Davis marker (1931), recognizing Davis as "A Statesman with Clean Hands and Pure Heart"
 Orren Randolph Smith marker (1930)
 Henry Timrod marker (1930), recognizing Timrod as "Laureate of the Confederacy"
 Matthew Fontaine Maury marker (1932). A Confederate Navy commander and slave owner, Maury investigated resettling American slaves in Brazil.
 Robert E. Lee Dixie Highway marker (1926), "In Loving Memory of Robert E. Lee...'The Shaft Memorial and Highway Straight Attest His Worth – He Cometh to His Own'"
 Zebulon Baird Vance marker (1928)
 Albert Pike marker (1928), "Arkansas Poet of the Confederacy"
 Calvary Episcopal Church Memorial (1927), "During the Civil War this Church was Used as Barracks by Confederate Troops"
 Forest City: Forest City Confederate Monument (1932)
 Franklin: Confederate Soldiers Memorial (1909)
 Gatesville: Confederate Soldiers Monument (1915)
 Goldsboro: Confederate Monument (May 10, 1883)
 Greensboro:
 Confederate Soldiers Monument at Green Hill Cemetery (1888) (Removed July 4, 2020)
 Confederate Soldiers Monument (1985)
 Army of Tennessee Monument (1986)
 Halifax: General Junius Daniel marker (1929)
 Harnett County: Confederate Monument (1872) at Chicora Civil War Cemetery to soldiers killed at the Battle of Averasborough, "In Memory of our Confederate Dead Who Fell Upon That Day"
 Hendersonville: Robert E. Lee Dixie Highway Marker (1926; re-dedicated 2008)
 High Point: Confederate Monument (1899), Oakwood Cemetery
 Holly Springs: Confederate Soldiers Monument (1923)
 Jacksonville: Confederate Soldiers Monument (1957)
 Justice: Confederate Soldiers Monument (1912) at Stallings Memorial Park
 Kinston:
 CSA Gen. Robert Hoke Monument (1920)
 Confederate Soldiers Monument (1924)
 CSS Neuse Confederate Ironclad Gunboat Monument
 Kure Beach:
 Confederate Memorial (1921)
 Fort Fisher Confederate Monument (1932); UDC monument erected at former site of Fort Fisher headquarters building
 Lenoir: Confederate Soldiers Monument (1910) in town square
 Lexington: Confederate Soldiers Monument (1905) Removed from Lexington public square in 2020.
 Louisburg:
 Confederate Soldiers Monument (1914) to "Our Confederate Dead". The monument was formerly on the street in front of Louisburg College, but the College has grown to surround the monument. Some on campus want it removed. "It's not clear whether the town owns the statue, or whether it belongs to the county or to the quiet but still active Joseph J. Davis 537 chapter of the United Daughters of the Confederacy."
 Middletown: Confederate Soldiers war Monument (2001)
 Mocksville: Davie County War Memorial (1987)
 Monroe: Located at the Old Union County Courthouse; the obelisk (1910) was erected by the UDC Monroe chapter
 Morgantown: Confederate Soldiers Monument (1918)
 New Bern: Confederate Monument (1885), Cedar Grove Cemetery
 Oxford: Granville Gray (1909), a memorial to the Confederate Veterans of Granville County
 Raleigh:
 See State capitol, above
 Confederate Monument (1870), Historic Oakwood Cemetery
 Reidsville: From 1910 to 2011, the monument stood in Reidsville's downtown area. In 2011, a motorist hit the monument, shattering the granite soldier which stood atop it. Placing the monument back in the center of town sparked a debate between local officials, neighbors and friends – which resulted in it being placed at its current site – the Greenview Cemetery. The new site contains a brand new statue. The original 101-year-old statue was completely destroyed.
 Rockingham: Confederate Soldiers Monument (1930)
 Rocky Mount: Nash County Confederate Monument (1917), honoring Confederate war dead in Edgecombe County and Nash Counties; rededicated to all veterans of all wars in 1976. On June 2, 2020, the City Council of Rocky Mount voted to remove it.
 Salisbury: Gloria Victis ("Glory to the Defeated", 1891), also called Fame Confederate Monument by Frederick Ruckstull, purchased by the UDC as a Confederate monument for Salisbury, relocated 1909. Removed in 2020 and relocated 2021.
 Selma: The Last Grand Review Monument (1990)
 Stanley: Monument at Stanley Community Center and Polling Place
 Sylva: Confederate Soldiers Monument (1915)
 Tarboro:
 Confederate Soldiers Monument (1904)
 Henry Lawson Wyatt Memorial Fountain (1910)
 Thomasville: Thomasville and Davidson County Civil War Memorial (2010)
 Tuxedo: Robert E. Lee Dixie Highway Marker (1927)
 Washington, Virginia: Confederate Soldiers Monument (1888), Oakdale Cemetery
 Weaverville: Zebulon Vance Birthplace
 Weldon: Confederate Soldiers Monument (1908; relocated 1934)
 Wentworth: Rockingham County Confederate Monument (1998)
 Wilmington:
 Oakdale Cemetery Confederate Mound (1872); North Carolina's first soldier statue
 Confederate Memorial (1924)
 Confederate Monument (1932)
 Confederate Monument (1998)
 George Davis Statue (1909)
 Rose O'Neale Greenhow Monument
 Wilson: Confederate Monument at Maplewood Cemetery (1902)
 Windsor: Memorial to the Confederate Dead, erected in 1896 by the Confederate Veterans Associations of Bertie County
 Yanceyville: Confederate Soldiers Monument (1921), Old Caswell County Courthouse

Private monuments
 Durham: Confederate memorial, Maplewood Cemetery. A block of granite with a bronze plaque. About 40 Confederate veterans are buried at the site. Erected in 2015 by the Sons of Confederate Veterans at a cost of about $3,000. Vandalized shortly thereafter with "Black Lives Matter" and "Tear It Down". Vandalized again in April, 2019, with "cement or another hard substance" smeared on the plaque.

Buildings
 Chapel Hill, two buildings at the University of North Carolina at Chapel Hill:
 Carr Hall, named for Confederate veteran Julian Shakespeare Carr. Renamed "Student Affairs Building" in 2020.
 Vance Hall, named for Civil War governor Zebulon Vance. There is also a portrait of Vance.
 Statesville: Governor Zebulon Vance House and Museum, where he fled after Union General Sherman captured Raleigh. Run by United Daughters of the Confederacy.

Inhabited places

Counties
 Hoke County (1911), named for CSA Maj. Gen. Robert Hoke
 Lee County (1907)
 Pender County (1875), named for CSA Gen. William Dorsey Pender
 Vance County (1881), named for CSA soldier and North Carolina governor Zebulon Baird Vance

Towns
 Carrboro (1882), named for CSA soldier and white supremacist Julian Carr
 Vanceboro
 Zebulon

Natural features
 North Carolina Confederate Veterans Forest (1956) 125,000 spruce pine trees were planted by the UDC in the 1940s as a living memorial to North Carolina Confederate Veterans. The forest was rededicated in 2001. The area is located beneath Mt. Hardy near the Blue Ridge Parkway.

Roads

 Asheville:
 Vance Crescent Street, named for Zebulon Vance (see above)
 Vance Gap Road,
 Vance Place Drive
 Black Mountain
 Vance Avenue
 Charlotte:
 Jefferson Davis Street
 E & W Stonewall Streets
 E & W Hill Streets
 Clinton: General Lee Lane
 Creedmoor:
 N. Durham Avenue, section of US Hwy 15 called the Jefferson Davis Highway
 Fleming Street - Founder of Creedmoor and former Confederate soldier
 Fayetteville: General Lee Avenue
 Flat Rock: Robert E. Lee Drive
 Hope Mills: Jefferson Davis Street
 Kinston: Robert E. Lee Drive
 Lexington: Confederate Street
 Mebane:
 Beauregard Lane
 Hill Lane
 Pickett Lane
 Stonewall Drive
 Stuart Lane
 Monroe: Confederate Street
 Salisbury:
 Beauregard Drive
 Confederate Avenue
 Pickett Avenue
 Stonewall Road
 Stuart Street
 Sanford: Robert E. Lee Drive
 Spencer:
 Beauregard Drive
 Confederate Avenue
 Pickett Avenue
 Stonewall Road
 Stuart Street
 Spring Lake: General Lee Street
 Stonewall: Stonewall Street
 Watha: Robert E. Lee Drive
 Wilmington: (all within the Pine Valley neighborhood)
 Beauregard Drive
 Bragg Drive, named for CSA Gen. Braxton Bragg
 Breckinridge Drive, named for CSA Gen. John C. Breckinridge
 Buckner Drive, named for CSA Brig. Gen. Simon Bolivar Buckner
 Confederate Drive
 Early Drive
 Jeb Stuart Drive
 Johnston Drive
 Longstreet Drive
 Merrimac Drive
 Pemberton Drive, named for CSA officer John C. Pemberton
 Pettigrew Drive, named for CSA Brig. Gen J. Johnston Pettigrew
 Pickett Drive
 Robert E. Lee Drive
 Stonewall Jackson Drive
 Windsor: Confederate Street
 Zebulon: Vance Street

Schools
 Asheville: Vance Elementary School- now Lucy S. Herring Elementary School.
 Charlotte: Zebulon B. Vance High School- now Julius L. Chambers High School.
 Henderson:
 Kerr-Vance Academy
 Northern Vance High School
 Vance Charter School
 Vance County Early College High School
 Vance County Middle School
 Vance County High School
 Zeb Vance Elementary School
Kittrell: Zeb Vance Elementary
 Raleigh:
 North Carolina State University: In 2016 the Faculty Senate passed a resolution asking that a reference to "the winds of Dixie" be removed from the school song
 Vance Elementary School

Notes

References

External links
 

North Carolina
Confederate Monuments
North Carolina
Lost Cause of the Confederacy
Sons of Confederate Veterans
United Daughters of the Confederacy monuments and memorials
Monuments and memorials in North Carolina
Confederate monuments and memorials in North Carolina